The Colt Automatic Rifle-15 or CAR-15 is a family of M16 rifle–based firearms marketed by Colt in the 1960s and early 1970s. However, the term "CAR-15" is most commonly associated with the Colt Commando (AKA: XM177); these select-fire carbines have ultrashort  and  barrels with over-sized flash suppressors.

The CAR-15 name was an attempt to re-associate the AR-15 name with Colt, since the AR initially stood for ArmaLite, the original manufacturer of the ArmaLite AR-15. Colt later abandoned the CAR-15 concept, but continued to make carbine variations, using the "M16" brand for select-fire models and the "Colt AR-15" brand for semi-automatic models. However, in present usage, "CAR-15" is the generic name for all carbine-length variants made before the M4 carbine.

History

Starting in 1965, Colt attempted to market the M16 rifle as a Modular Weapon System. By using various upper assemblies, buttstocks, and pistol grips, the weapon could be configured as assault rifles, carbines, submachine guns, open-bolt squad automatic weapons and a survival rifle version. Belt-fed light machine guns were also developed under the CAR-15 banner, although they have little in common with the M16 rifle. However, the U.S. military only made significant purchases of the Rifle and Commando versions, so Colt abandoned the CAR-15 family concept. The "CAR-15 Rifle" was already identified by most users as the M16 rifle, and "CAR-15" was similarly associated with the short-barreled Colt Submachine Gun and Commando models. Because of that, the term "CAR-15" has been used to describe any M16-based carbine, even if the particular weapon is not officially named this.

Colt Automatic Rifle-15 family

CAR-15 Rifle (AKA: M16 rifle)

The Model 603 CAR-15 Rifle, adopted initially by the United States Army as the XM16E1 and then later as the M16A1, and the Model 604 CAR-15 Rifle, adopted by the United States Air Force as the M16, formed the core of the CAR-15 family. However, the United States military had already committed to purchases before Colt created the concept of the CAR-15 weapons system. The principal difference between the Model 603 and Model 604 is that the former has a forward assist, allowing a user to manually close a stuck bolt.

CAR-15 Heavy Assault Rifle M1
The CAR-15 Heavy Assault Rifle M1 was a heavy-barreled version of the standard AR-15 with a bipod attachment, intended for use as a Squad Automatic Weapon (SAW). It was designed to feed from 30-round box magazines.

CAR-15 Heavy Assault Rifle M2
The CAR-15 Heavy Assault Rifle M2 was a belt-fed conversion of the standard CAR-15, with a heavy barrel and bipod attachment. It was made in prototype form only and saw no sales.

CAR-15 Carbine

The Model 605A CAR-15 Carbine was a shortened version for situations where longer weapons could be unwieldy, such as aboard vehicles or helicopters. It was an improved version of the AR-15 SBR (Colt Model 605), which was a shorter barrel version of the Colt Armalite AR-15. Because of the shorter barrel, no bayonet mounting lugs were provided.

The Model 605B had no forward assist, but had a four-position selector switch (developed by Foster Sturtevant in December 1966) so that a user could select safe, semi-automatic, three-round burst, or full automatic modes of fire. Unlike the standard three-position group, the four-position group went from (going clockwise from the 9 o'clock position) safe, fully automatic, semi-automatic and finally burst. The selector itself had 360 degrees of motion, and could be moved either clockwise or counterclockwise, unlike with standard groups. Instead of three-round burst, the burst cam could be modified to two-round or six-round burst. Both versions used the rifle-length buttstock.

As early as 1964, United States Navy SEALs were using the CAR-15 Carbine.

CAR-15 Submachine Gun (AKA: CAR-15 Model 607)

In late 1959, Colt introduced a Tanker Model of the AR-15. It was the first AR-15 made with a retractable buttstock, with its overall length being only  with the buttstock retracted. The barrel is too short to mount a bayonet, so the SMG had no bayonet lug.
In 1965, Colt introduces the new Model 607 CAR-15 Submachine Gun (SMG), which is an improved version of the Colt Armalite AR-15 Tanker Model with some modifications from the M16. It was a compact weapon for use by special forces and vehicle crewmen. The dictionary definition of submachine gun is an automatic firearm that fires pistol-caliber cartridges. However, manufacturers such as Colt, Heckler & Koch, and Zastava Arms have referred to compact carbines as submachine guns, to emphasize their short length and to differentiate them from longer carbines.

About 50 CAR-15 SMGs were made. Most were issued to Navy SEALs and Army Special Forces, though some were also given to Army K-9 units. Since it never went into full production, CAR-15 SMGs were assembled from available spare parts. The first models were made with M16 receivers without forward assists and with shortened pistol grips from the Survival Rifle (see below). The later Model 607A was made with XM16E1 receiver with forward assist and standard pistol grip. The handguard was made from full-length rifle handguard by cutting it in half and using either the fore or aft pair, after machining the ends to fit the slip ring and handguard cap.

Because of the short barrel, the CAR-15 SMGs suffered from a loud and bright muzzle blast, and a number of muzzle devices were developed to reduce this. The SMGs were initially fitted with the standard M16 rifle's "duckbill" or three-prong flash hiders, which did not alleviate the problem. However, the moderator created its own problems, such as heavy bore fouling and causing tracer bullets to wildly yaw.

Colt Commando (AKA: CAR-15, XM177 & GAU-5)

The Colt Commando was not initially part of the CAR-15 Military Weapons System, but was added in 1966 in response to the US military's desire for a shorter M16 and without the Model 607 SMG's inadequacies. Colt engineer Rob Roy designed a simpler two-position telescoping tubular aluminum buttstock to replace the complicated extending triangular version. The fragile and ad hoc triangular handguards were replaced by reinforced round handguards. Each half of the round handguard is identical, simplifying logistics by not requiring a top/bottom or left/right pair. The Model 609 Commando has a forward assist, while the Model 610 Commando does not. A Model 610B with a four-position selector was available, but not used by the U.S. military.

The XM177 uses a unique flash suppressor sometimes called a flash or sound moderator for its  barrel. This device reduces flash signature greatly and sound signature slightly, making the normally louder short barreled carbine sound like a longer barreled M16A1. Although it has no internal baffles and does not completely reduce the sound signature to subsonic levels, because it alters the sound level of the weapon, the US Bureau of Alcohol Tobacco Firearms and Explosives has declared this muzzle device to be a sound suppressor and regulates its civilian purchase in the United States.

The Model 610 was classified as the XM177 but adopted by the Air Force as the GAU-5/A Submachine Gun (GA denoting an automatic gun and U a complete unit rather than a parts kit: the popular "gun aircraft unit" and "gun automatic unit" explanations are backronyms). The Army purchased 2,815 Model 609 CAR-15 Commandos on June 28, 1966, which were officially designated Submachine Gun, 5.56 mm, XM177E1. As part of the contract, Colt was supposed to supply each XM177E1s with seven 30-round magazines, but Colt was unable to build a reliable 30-round curved magazine that would fit in the M16 magazine well, so most XM177E1s were shipped with 20-round magazines. The exception was 5th Special Forces Group, who received a total of four early 30-round magazines.  Colt completed delivery of the purchased XM177E1s in March 1967.

The increased length reduced noise and muzzle flash, and allowed fitting of the Colt XM148 grenade launcher. A metal boss was added to the moderator for mounting of the XM148 and rifle grenades. The chambers were chrome-plated. The Commandos with the longer barrels were called the Model 629 and Model 649. The Model 629 Commando has a forward assist; the Model 649 Commando does not.

In April 1967, the Army purchased 510 Model 629 Commandos for use by troops assigned to the Military Assistance Command, Vietnam Studies and Observations Group (MACV-SOG), and designated them XM177E2.  Delivery was completed by the end of September 1967. The Air Force adopted a similar model without the forward assist feature as the GAU-5A/A.  Sources debate whether or not this was a Colt Model 630 or Model 649.  According to John Plaster and other sources, the lack of 30-round magazines continued to be problematic and SOG operators resorted to pooling their personal resources and purchasing the larger capacity magazines on the civilian U.S. market.  Problems with range, accuracy, barrel fouling, and usage of tracer bullets continued to plague the XM177 series, but Colt estimated that it would take a six-month $400,000 program to do a complete ballistic and kinematic study. There were also recommendations for a 29-month $635,000 research and development program. Both recommendations were declined by the U.S. military as American ground force involvement in the Vietnam War was gradually winding down. Production of the CAR-15 Commando ended in 1970.

CAR-15 Survival Rifle
The Model 608 CAR-15 Survival Rifle was meant for use by downed aircrew. Because of the CAR-15's modular design, the Survival Rifle could be broken down into two subassemblies and stowed with four 20-round magazines in a pilot's seat pack. The Survival Rifle used a fixed tubular plastic-coated aluminum buttstock and a round handguard that were not used on the other CAR-15 versions, and did not have either a forward assist or a bayonet lug.

Post-Vietnam

After the Vietnam War, Colt abandoned the CAR-15 Modular Weapon System concept, but continued to develop short barrel carbines. These were marketed as "M16s", while the civilian and law-enforcement semi-automatic counterparts were marketed as "Colt AR-15s". Although, they were all commonly called CAR-15s.

M16 Carbine (AKA: CAR-15)
The barrel length was compatible with the existing carbine-length gas system and allowed for the mounting of a standard M16 bayonet. Despite having a longer barrel, it's no longer than the Colt Commando, as the longer barrel did not require the long 4.5 inch moderator of the XM177 series, only the much shorter M16 birdcage-type flash hider. Colt labeled the M16 carbines the Model 651, 652, 653, or 654, depending on whether or not it had a fixed or retractable buttstock, or a forward assist. Only the Model 653 M16A1 carbine, with retractable buttstock and forward assist would be purchased in significant numbers by the U.S. military. The Malaysian Armed Forces and the Armed Forces of the Philippines, purchased Model 653s in small numbers for special operations forces or security forces.

GUU-5/P

The GUU-5/P was a result of United States Air Force making ad-hoc upgrades to its GAU-5 series. The barrels and flash suppressor were replaced with the longer  barrel with a 1-in-12 twist, but the weapons retained their original designations. With the change to M855 cartridges, they either received 1-in-7 twist barrel or complete upper receiver assembly replacements. The GAU-5s markings were also removed and the weapons were re-stamped GUU-5/P. These were used by the British Special Air Service during the Falklands War.

M4 carbine

In the early 1980s, at the request of the United States Marine Corps, Colt upgraded the M16A1 rifle, resulting in the M16A2 rifle. Among the major changes were a reinforced lower receiver, a case deflector, a birdcage flash suppressor redesigned to be a muzzle brake, and a barrel with a faster 1-in-7 twist. The faster barrel was necessitated by the switch from the 55-grain M193 bullet to the 62-grain M855 bullet. The M16A2 rifle's barrel was also thicker for the portion in front of the handguard. Colt incorporated these changes into its carbines, which it called M16A2 carbines. The Model 723 M16A2 carbine used the iron sights of the M16A1, but had a case deflector. The barrel had a 1-in-7 twist, but the thinner profile of the older M16A1 carbine's barrel. As with the Model 653, the United States military made small purchases of the Model 723 for its special operation forces. It was notably used by Delta Force operators from the late 1980s to the early 1990s.

In 1983, Diemaco developed a carbine similar to the Model 723, the C8 carbine for use by the Canadian Forces. The original C8s were built by Colt as the Model 725. In 1984, the U.S. government asked Colt to develop a carbine with maximum commonality with the issue M16A2. Colt named the carbine as the XM4. The project would eventually culminate in the development and official adoption of the M4 carbine in 1994.

M4 Commando

Though Colt has focused its attention on carbines with  barrels and rifles with  barrels, Colt continues to make carbines with  barrels, which it calls Commandos. Originally, Commandos were assembled from whatever spare parts were available, so Model 733 Commandos could have A1-style upper receivers with case deflectors or A2-style upper receivers, and M16A1-profile 1:7 or M16A2-profile 1:7 barrels. Depending on the specific models, Commandos may have had three-position fire control groups (safe/semi-automatic/three-round burst), or four-position having both full-automatic and burst. The modern Model 933 has a "flattop" receiver, with a removable carrying handle and a MIL-STD-1913 Picatinny rail, with semi-automatic and automatic fire. The Model 935 Commando has the features of the Model 933, but has three-round burst fire instead of automatic. Though originally called the M16A2 Commando, Colt now markets them as the M4 Commando.

The M4 Commando with its short  barrel suffers the same failings as its predecessors: a substantially lower muzzle velocity and greater muzzle flash, in comparison to longer M16 rifles and carbines. The lower muzzle velocity can reduce carbines' wounding effects. However, United States Marine Corps Force Reconnaissance personnel sometimes used M4 Commandos in place of their M9 pistols. United States Army Special Operations Command Groups also use M4 Commandos as self-defense weapons. United States Navy SEALs use the ultra-compact Mk 18 Mod 0 with its  barrel in a similar role.

GAU-5A Aircrew Self Defense Weapon
In 2019, a solution to give a personal firepower upgrade over the traditional sidearm for US aircrews in ACES ejection seat–equipped aircraft was to use commercially available AR-15 rifle parts including a special short quick-release barrel, collapsible stock, folding pistol-grip, and four magazines to fit inside the survival kit pan of the ejection seat. Major Gibson, an Air Force spokesperson, said, “This has driven the dimension of 16 x 14 x 3.5 inches.” The Aircrew Self Defense Weapon is to be included in survival kits for A-10, B-1, B-2, B-52, F-15C, F-15E, F-16, and F-22 aircraft. The rifle is being built at U.S. Air Force Gunsmith Shop at Joint Base San Antonio-Lackland, Texas. 2,137 GAU-5A ASDWs are planned.

Gallery

See also
 Colt Automatic Rifle
 AKS-74U - Soviet/Russian counterpart
 QBZ-95B - Chinese counterpart
 Comparison of the AK-47 and M16

References

Further reading 

 Ezell, Edward. Small Arms Today, 2nd Edition. Harrisburg, PA: Stackpole Books, 1988. .
 Gervasi, Tom. Arsenal of Democracy III: America's War Machine, the Pursuit of Global Dominance. New York, NY: Grove Press, Inc, 1984. .
 Plaster, John. Secret Commandos: Behind Enemy Lines with the Elite Warriors of SOG Penguin Books, 2004.

External links

"Colt XM177 5.56mm Submachine Gun" – Warboats.org
U.S. SUBMACHINE GUN XM177 – Springfield Armory Collection
Retro Black Rifle.com – Guide to AR10/AR15/M16 Rifles up to the mid-1980s

Colt rifles
Submachine guns of the United States
Cold War firearms of the United States
Rifles of the United States
Carbines
5.56 mm firearms
Military equipment introduced in the 1960s
ArmaLite AR-10 derivatives